Malda Women's College, established in 1970, is a women's college in Malda district of West Bengal, India. The college is affiliated to the University of Gour Banga and offers undergraduate courses in arts. The campus is situated in Malda.

Departments
Bengali 
English
History
Geography
Political Science
Philosophy
Sociology
Education
Economics
Women's studies(General)

Accreditation
The college is affiliated to University of Gour Banga and recognized by the University Grants Commission (UGC).

See also

References

External links
Malda Women's College
University of Gour Banga
University Grants Commission
National Assessment and Accreditation Council

Women's universities and colleges in West Bengal
Universities and colleges in Malda district
Colleges affiliated to University of Gour Banga
Academic institutions formerly affiliated with the University of North Bengal
Educational institutions established in 1970
1970 establishments in West Bengal